Gregory Butte is a 4,651-foot (1,418 meter) elevation sandstone summit located in Glen Canyon National Recreation Area, in San Juan County of southern Utah. This iconic landmark of the Lake Powell area towers nearly 1,000 feet above the lake. Before Lake Powell was formed in the 1970s, this butte was set within a meander of the Colorado River. Gregory Butte is a butte composed of Entrada Sandstone. This sandstone, which was originally deposited as sandy mud on a tidal flat, is believed to have formed about 160 million years ago during the Jurassic period as a giant sand sea, the largest in Earth's history. This geographical feature's name was officially adopted in 1977 by the U.S. Board on Geographic Names. According to the Köppen climate classification system, Gregory Butte is located in an arid climate zone with hot, very dry summers, and chilly winters with very little snow. Geologist Herbert E. Gregory (1869–1952), mapped much of the bedrock geology of the Colorado Plateau, particularly in geologic monographs concentrating on what is now Navajo Nation land in northern Arizona and southern Utah where this butte is located.

See also
 Colorado Plateau
 List of rock formations in the United States

Gallery

References

External links
 Weather forecast: Gregory Butte
 1958 aerial photo of Gregory Butte before Lake Powell

Colorado Plateau
Landforms of San Juan County, Utah
Glen Canyon National Recreation Area
Lake Powell
Buttes of Utah
North American 1000 m summits
Sandstone formations of the United States